The "REX" Chair is a Slovenian wood chair design that is included in the collection of the Museum of Modern Art MOMA in New York City and was designed by Slovene architect and designer Niko Kralj (1920-2013) in 1952. In 2012, it was given a permanent place in Designmuseum, Denmark, the largest museum of design in Scandinavia. It became a cult object for design lovers around the globe with its calm contemporary elegance and a feeling of floating. It is the most internationally notable Slovenian design item and in 2004, at the 50th anniversary of its development there was at the Museum of Modern Art in Ljubljana an exhibition devoted to the REX chair. REX chair was ranked at the second place as the Slovenian product of 20th century according to the ″Finance″ newspaper in 1999.

Development
At the time Kralj was manager of Stol development services. He ranked among such international industrial design legends as Charles and Ray Eames or Alvar Aalto and has conquered the world with his innovative design. Kralj received the Prešeren Prize, as well. The REX chair was elevated to the level of a cult item. It was the first chair in Slovenia made in technology of molded, perforated plywood designed for mass production.

Basic designs
The back of the chair is perforated to allow for ventilation and to reduce the weight. Bent plywood armrests support the elbows and joint to the back panel strengthens the chair structure. Basic designs of the REX Chair include:
 Model 120 (1953) the plywood sidepieces were replaced with perforated three dimensionally turned plywood. The two extreme structural crosspieces on the front edge of the seat and the top of the back were removed and replaced by glued strips. The armrests were made of bent wood.
 Model 101 (1954) is a variation of REX Chair 120, without armrests. Removing the armrests had a negative effect of structural stability, so two cross bindings were added between the rear legs for strength.
 Model 5654 (1956), the best known chair in the Rex family, is still being produced today, as a low armchair intended to be used in covered areas. It has been produced in various styles depending on its assigned use, as a club chair, a high-backed chair or an auditorium chair. Rex 5654, a collapsible variation model of 120, was patented in 1958 as a unique kind of folding armchair. All elements in the chair are mutually connected.
 Model 140 has a back that is connected to the front legs, which meet the diagonal rear legs in the middle section. The height of the back panel is the same as in the classic REX Chair, only here whole plywood is used for the upper half of the back panel.
 Model 5652 is a folding dining chair with a higher and shorter seat and with legs that stand more vertically than in Model 1954.
 The restaurant chair has perforated seat and back panels, straight/standing legs and a slightly inclined back. It is suitable for loading.
 The Rex Program also included coffee tables, chaises longues, and rocking chairs (Model 5655). Foreign manufacturers produced copies of the REX Chair in plastic. These chairs could be used outdoors, as well, but they never attained the high aesthetic quality of the original.

Production
Exclusive holder for manufacturing and distribution rights of REX chair is Impakta Les. REX Collection in production today consists of Rex Folding Chair, Rex Folding Lounge Chair, Rex Folding Rocking Chair, Rex Folding Daybed and Rex Folding Table.
Until today, they have produced over 2 million chairs.

History
 First model (1952)
The Chair is made entirely of wood. It consists of a solid beechwood frame for secured pieces of bowed plywood with a rectangular shape. The armrests, made of solid wood with the front sections cut in a round shape, are joined statically to the two diagonal legs.
 Second model
The end of the curved sidepieces are set in the crosspieces at the edges of the seat and the back panels; in this way the use of visible wood screws is avoided at the front of the chair. The crosspiece on the seat contributes to the chair's greater comfort.
 Third model
The seat and the back panels are created by the cross pieces designed in a mold. In this way, the problematic sharp bend between the seat and the back is avoided and the length of individual rods is shortened. The seat and back are curved to the shape of the body. The rear legs extend into the armrest. The formation of this element requires high-quality wood with a good deal of waste involved. This is a prefabricated chair held together with bolts and nuts.
 Fourth model
The seat and back are the same as in the third model. The armrest and the front and rear legs are all in one piece. This element is made of veneers designed in a mold and requires solid wood reinforcements. “The use of wood is reduced to the minimum; the armchair is prefabricated and stable even without bindings on the legs.” The shortened armrests, however, is problematic, since it does not provide the best support, especially for the elbow.
 Fifth model
The seat and the back are the same as in the third model. The front and rear legs touch at the top and the spread apart diagonally downwards. To support this A-shape, the plywood armrest, which is curved at a right angle (through high-frequency dielectric heating), is affixed to the upper section. The chair structure is strengthened further by the armrest being joined to the back panel.
 Sixth model (1953)
The slats that were set shallowly into the side element were not able to withstand abrupt burdens and so are replaced by perforated three-dimensionally  bent plywood, shaped to the contours of the body. The panels are inserted between two sidepieces. The edge pieces on the front of the seat panel and the top of the back panel are replaces by glued strips.
In 1954, Model No. 56 was accepted for mass production under the name Rex 120.

References

External links
REX Chair, official website
REX designed by Niko Kralj, interior magazine article, interiorzine.com 

Chairs
Individual models of furniture
Portable furniture